Ken or Kenneth Reid may refer to:

 Ken Reid (comics) (1919–1987), British cartoonist
 Ken Reid (journalist) (born 1955), Northern Irish journalist
 Ken Reid (comedian) (born 1980), American stand-up comedian
 Kenneth Reid (legal scholar), professor of Scottish law at University of Edinburgh
 Kenneth A. Reid (1919–1996), American art director

See also
Ken Reed (disambiguation)
Ken Read (disambiguation)